Potamia is a village on the island of Thasos, Greece. It is built in the valley at the foot of Mount Ipsario, and surrounded to the south and east by pine and sweet chestnut forests. Its coastal annexe is the holiday resort of Skala Potamias. Potamia was the birthplace of the Greek-born American sculptor Polygnotos Vagis, and a museum dedicated to his work exists in the village. Etymologically, the name of the village is derived from the streams that run through it.

Gallery 

Populated places in Thasos